Nättinen is the surname of the following people
Joonas Nättinen (born 1991), Finnish ice hockey player
Julius Nättinen (born 1997), Finnish ice hockey player
Jussi Nättinen (born 1987), Finnish ice hockey player
Topi Nättinen (born 1994), Finnish ice hockey player

Finnish-language surnames